Co-production (also spelled coproduction) may refer to:

co-production (media), a joint venture between film, television, or other production companies
co-production (society), the joint production of new knowledge or technologies between different groups in society
co-production (public services)